Ballangen Church is a parish church of the Church of Norway in Narvik Municipality in Nordland county, Norway. It is located in the village of Ballangen. It is one of the churches for the Ballangen parish which is part of the Ofoten prosti (deanery) in the Diocese of Sør-Hålogaland. The white, wooden church was built in a long church style in 1923 using plans drawn up by the architect Høyer Ellefsen. The church seats about 280 people.  The building was consecrated on 6 June 1923 by Bishop Johan Støren. The church holds worship services two or three Sundays each month.

Media gallery

See also
List of churches in Sør-Hålogaland

References

Narvik
Churches in Nordland
Wooden churches in Norway
20th-century Church of Norway church buildings
Churches completed in 1923
1923 establishments in Norway
Long churches in Norway